Chameleon is the fifth studio album by German power metal band Helloween, released in 1993. It is their most musically adventurous release, but also their least commercially successful, and is their last studio album to feature singer Michael Kiske until 2021's self-titled album, as well as their last with original drummer Ingo Schwichtenberg. It was Schwichtenberg's last album to be recorded during his lifetime. This was also the last album on EMI Records.

Background
The album contains four singles: "When The Sinner", "I Don't Wanna Cry No More",
"Windmill", and "Step Out of Hell".

The album was a failure both critically and commercially, and vocalist Michael Kiske and drummer Ingo Schwichtenberg were fired after the subsequent promotional tour.

Michael Weikath stated that 'Chameleon' could have been better with a different approach but it was the result of what was there at the time and the intentions they had with it. The band were lambasted with debts of the amount of two million Deutschmarks, and were just trying to get rid of that and thought that if they made the album commercial it would work.
"Step Out of Hell" was one of the older tracks Roland Grapow had done with his old band Rampage,  which was released originally as a track called "Victims Of Rock". Grapow changed the lyrics and he remade it as a song with Helloween. The lyrics dealt with Ingo Schwichtenberg.

Grapow's song "Music" was also recorded differently and bluesier with other lyrics by Rampage. It's on the second record they did in 1983 "Love Lights Up The Night".

Grapow stated that 'Chameleon' was something that the band needed to do. A lot of people hated it in the beginning but a lot of people later, when they're 20 years older, just realized it's like a good rock album. There was a lot of ’70s era in the song “Music” and in his guitar part on “When The Sinner.” He was listening a lot to Stevie Ray Vaughan at the time and was also influenced by Brian May. 
Grapow still liked the album 
and stated that it's a really deep and timeless album that is not so much for the big metal fans. Helloween wanted to change the musical direction and try some new material. That was the main reason. There wasn't any pressure from the label or from the outside. Nobody at the label heard the demos, and the band had 100% control.

A problem with the 'Chameleon' situation was that Grapow was still new in the band at the time and he didn't know which way he should approach to the whole band. Grapow was the new guy, he tried to write some heavy metal tunes, which he did on 'Pink Bubbles Go Ape'. He thought he did a good job, but the other band members, the songwriters, they had changed. And he didn't know why. They did the 'Keeper' albums and then Kai Hansen was gone and they tried to do totally different kind of music. 'Pink Bubbles' wasn't so bad, and 'Chameleon' was a total different world. Grapow described 'Chameleon' as the three Helloween songwriters' solo record.

Bass player Markus Grosskopf stated that 'Chameleon' captured the time and the mood that the band was in, so he doesn't see it as a mistake. Helloween was not able to do anything different, and they weren't interested in doing anything else. Grosskopf thought that 'Chameleon' had to be done like that, to come to a point where the band had to change themselves. Grosskopf  thought 'Chameleon' was a cool album, but it sounded a bit weird with Helloween written on it. 
It was a difficult album to make because they had some serious personal problems at that time.

Singer Michael Kiske stated that the best way to describe 'Chameleon' was that it's a three men solo album. There were three songwriters trying to make a solo record. Helloween was dysfunctional and were not functioning as a band anymore. When they did the “Chameleon” record, it was still an honest record, they did the best they could out of the situation, but they were not a band. The members weren't working together to get the songs. Ingo Schwichtenberg was very sick and the album recording was the last thing he did. After he did the drumming he had a breakdown. It was not a pleasant time. But Kiske thinks the record shows that in a way, that there were some very dramatic stuff on it when you look at some of the lyrics.

Track listing

M - 1,2 also appears on the When The Sinner single.
M - 3,4,5 also appears on the Windmill & Step Out of Hell singles.
M - 6,7 also appears on the I Don't Wanna Cry No More single.

Personnel

Helloween
Michael Kiske - vocals, acoustic guitar
Michael Weikath - guitars
Roland Grapow - guitars
Markus Grosskopf - bass
Ingo Schwichtenberg - drums

Guests
Axel Bergstedt - conductor, church organ in "I Believe"
Children's choir of the Orchestra "Johann Sebastian Bach", Hamburg in "I Believe"
Stefan Pintev - violin

Three of the children of the children's choir are Aminata, Jazz and Sophie from Black Buddafly, who had been 12 and 13 years old when they sang for Chameleon.

Charts

Recording information
Recorded in 1992 at Chateau De Pape in Hamburg, Germany
Mixed in 1992 at Scream Studios in Los Angeles, United States
Mastered at Precision Mastering, Hollywood, United States
Produced by Helloween and Tommy Hansen, assisted by Michael Tibes
Mixed by Michael Wagener at Double Trouble Productions Inc., assisted by Craig Boubet
Mastered by Stephen Marcussen
Logo by Michael Weikath and sleeve design by Michael Kiske
All songs are published by Zomba Music Publishers (LTD) S.F. USA

References

Helloween albums
1993 albums
EMI Records albums

es:Chameleon#Música